Basail Union is a union of Basail Upazila, Tangail District, Bangladesh.

Demographics
According to the 2011 Bangladesh census, Basail Union had 6,388 households and a population of 26,706. The literacy rate (age 7 and over) was 50.4% (male: 53.2%, female: 48%).

See also
 Union Councils of Tangail District

References

Populated places in Tangail District
Unions of Basail Upazila